"I Like the Way" is a song by Australian singer songwriter, Deni Hines. The song was released in June 1996 as the third single from her debut studio album, Imagination (1996). The single missed the top fifty in Australia, but peaked at number 37 in the United Kingdom and at number 4 on the Dance Club Songs in the United States.

Track listing
 Australian CD single (MUSH7DCX)
 "I Like The Way" (Album Mix Radio Edit) - 3:35
 "I Like The Way" (Acapella) - 4:36
 "How Can I Be Sure?"	- 4:05

 European CD Maxi 
 "I Like The Way" (Album Mix Radio Edit) - 3:35
 "I Like The Way" (Don-E Master Mix) - 4:5-
 "I Like The Way" (Don-E 90BPM Master Mix) -	5:23
 "I Like The Way" (Richie P Chill Mix)	- 4:15
 "I Like The Way" (David Morales Prelude Mix) - 10:52
 "I Like The Way"  (David Morales Classic Club Mix)	- 9:40

Charts

Credits
 Arranged by [Strings] – Stephen Hussey
 Artwork [design] – Ade Britteon, Craig Gentle, Michelle Le Tissier
 Engineer – Pete Lewis, Tim Russell
 Strings [strings performed by] – Pure Strings*
 Drums, bass, electric piano [Fender Rhodes], sitar, guitar, programmed and arranged by [strings] – Ian Green

References

External links
 Deni Hines "I Like the Way" at Discogs

1996 songs
1996 singles
Mushroom Records singles